Tom Mahaffey is an American bridge player.

Bridge accomplishments

Wins

 North American Bridge Championships (1)
 Spingold (1) 1985

Runners-up

 North American Bridge Championships (2)
 Jacoby Open Swiss Teams (1) 1984 
 Spingold (1) 1987

Notes

American contract bridge players
Living people
Year of birth missing (living people)